1,3-Benzodioxole (1,2-methylenedioxybenzene) is an organic compound with the formula CHOCH. The compound is classified as benzene derivative and a heterocyclic compound containing the methylenedioxy functional group. It is a colorless liquid.

Although benzodioxole is not particularly important, many related compounds containing the methylenedioxyphenyl group are bioactive, and thus are found in pesticides and pharmaceuticals.

Preparation
1,3-Benzodioxole can be synthesized from catechol with disubstituted halomethanes.

See also 
 1,4-Benzodioxine
 MDMA
 Methylenedioxy
 Safrole
 Piperonal

References